Lisleby Fotballklubb is a multi-sports club from Fredrikstad, Norway. The team plays football and athletics at Lisleby Stadion.

The club was founded as an association football club on 8 May 1920. Two years later, the club expanded with athletics, wrestling and boxing. From 1924, speed skating was also introduced. Wrestling was abandoned in 1927 and boxing in 1935. A handball team was established in 1949. In 1966, the football team played in the 1. divisjon, the top tier in Norwegian football.

References

External links
Official site

Football clubs in Norway
Eliteserien clubs
Defunct athletics clubs in Norway
Norwegian handball clubs
1920 establishments in Norway
Association football clubs established in 1920
Sport in Fredrikstad
Defunct speed skating clubs in Norway
Multi-sport clubs in Norway